Caye Chapel is a small, private island  in Belize,  north-northeast of Belize City and  south of Caye Caulker. It was once owned by Isaiah Emmanuel Morter, Belize's first African millionaire. 

Caye Chapel is adjacent to the Bacalar Chico National Park and Marine Reserve (BCNPMR), a UNESCO World Heritage Site. BCNPMR is part of the Mesoamerican Barrier Reef System, the world's second longest barrier reef, which is home to the Great Blue Hole and other popular SCUBA diving destinations accessible from Caye Chapel.

In comparison to other typically rural cayes and islands in the vicinity, it features an airstrip, 18 hole golf course,  clubhouse and conference facilities.  The golf course, named White Shark Golf Course, was co-designed by former PGA Tour player and World Golf Hall of Fame member Greg Norman, alongside former LPGA Tour player and World Golf Hall of Fame member Lorena Ochoa. The golf course is situated within the middle area of the 280 acre island, with the southernmost point of the golf course situated beside the Caye Chapel airstrip.

Four Seasons Hotels and Resorts will open a luxury resort on Caye Chapel in 2021 featuring approximately 50 private estate lots, 35 private residences, and 100 guest rooms and suites.

It is possible to snorkel and fish around the island.

References

Gallery

External links
Caye Chapel Golf Resort

Islands of Belize
Belize District
Belize Rural South
Private islands of Belize
Populated places in Belize